
Harold George "Jerry" Jerrard (1921 – 2013) was a British physicist known for his books with Donald Burgess McNeill. His research concerned optics, and included reviving the theory of the Poincaré sphere for modeling the behavior of polarised light, 60 years after it was suggested by Henri Poincaré and then largely forgotten. He was a reader of physics at the University of Southampton, a professor of physics at Oklahoma State University–Stillwater, and a Fellow of the Institute of Physics. He also enjoyed sailing on the Solent, and served for 20 years in local politics in the Borough of Fareham, becoming leader of the borough council, mayor, and a member of the Hampshire County Council.

Selected publications

Books
Jerrard, H. G., and McNeill, D. B. (1960). Theoretical and Experimental Physics. United Kingdom: Chapman & Hall.
Jerrard, H. G., and McNeill, D. B. (1963). A Dictionary of Scientific Units, Including Dimensionless Numbers and Scales. United Kingdom: Chapman & Hall. 6th ed., 1992.

Articles

References

1921 births
2013 deaths
British physicists
British sailors
Academics of the University of Southampton
Oklahoma State University faculty
Mayors of places in Hampshire
Fellows of the Institute of Physics